N12 may refer to:

Roads
 N12 (South Africa)
 N12 road (Ghana)
 N12 road (Ireland)
 Nebraska Highway 12, United States
 Route nationale 12, France

Other uses
 , a submarine of the Royal Navy
 Interstitial nephritis
 Lakewood Airport, New Jersey, United States
 LNER Class N12, a class of British steam locomotives
 Nissan Pulsar (N12), a Japanese car
 Nitrogen-12, an isotope of nitrogen
 Nylon 12, a polymer
 N12, a postcode district in the N postcode area, North London, England

See also
 12N (disambiguation)